Oregon Route 82 (OR 82) is a  state highway in the northeastern part of the U.S. state of Oregon. It travels from U.S. Route 30 (US 30) at La Grande to an intersection with Oregon Routes 350 and 351 in Joseph. It is known as the Wallowa Lake Highway No. 10 (see Oregon highways and routes).  OR 82 is part of the Hells Canyon Scenic Byway.

OR 82 is the main route from remote Wallowa County to La Grande which serves as a transportation hub, providing access to main roads such as Interstate 84 (I-84) and US 30. It also sees extra tourist traffic in the summer, which mostly consists of travelers to Wallowa Lake, which is south of Joseph.

Route description

OR 82 begins at an intersection with U.S. Route 30 (Adams Avenue). It heads east underneath Interstate 84 into Island City, where it turns north at an intersection with OR 237, which continues east to Cove. Once out of Island City, it curves northeast and passes through Imbler, Elgin, and enters Wallowa County at Minam. From there, the highway curves southeast into the Wallowa Valley, passing through the towns of Wallowa, Lostine, and Enterprise before ending in Joseph.
OR 351 from Joseph to the Wallowa Lake State Park at the south end of the Lake was originally part of the OR 82 Highway.

Major intersections

References

082
Transportation in Wallowa County, Oregon
Transportation in Union County, Oregon
Enterprise, Oregon
1932 establishments in Oregon
Joseph, Oregon
La Grande, Oregon